Rebellion is a 1924 novel by the Austrian writer Joseph Roth. It tells the story of a war veteran who has become a street musician after losing one leg. The novel was published in the newspaper Vorwärts from 27 July to 29 August 1924. It has been adapted for television twice: in 1962 by Wolfgang Staudte, and in 1993 by Michael Haneke.

Reception
Nicholas Lezard of The Guardian reviewed the book in 2000: "Roth's tale has that very European, straightforward, fairy-tale logic that makes everything both inevitable yet strangely nightmarish. You wouldn't be far wrong to think of Roth as occupying the fourth corner of a square whose other apices are Kafka, Musil and Stefan Zweig." Lezard continued: "At one or two points the novel leaps into strange, almost magical-realist territory; not a term I like much, but it suggests the sense of dreamlike dislocation you feel from time to time while reading. This portrait of one of the shards of a splintering society is deceptively simple, but will haunt you for a long time afterwards."

See also
 1924 in literature
 Austrian literature

References

External links
 Rebellion at Projekt Gutenberg-DE 

1924 German-language novels
Austrian novels
Novels by Joseph Roth
Novels first published in serial form
Novels set in the interwar period